Jacobowsky und der Oberst, Op. 49, (Jacobovsky and the Colonel) is an opera in four acts by Giselher Klebe who also wrote the libretto based on the 1944 play  by Franz Werfel.

It premiered on 2 November 1965 at the Hamburg State Opera which had commissioned the work. Klebe dedicated it to the then director of the Staatsoper, Rolf Liebermann.

Roles

Time and place: 1940, Paris, St. Cyrill, Bayonne and Saint-Jean-de-Luz

The first American performance was on 27 June 1967 at the Metropolitan Opera in New York City, using the same cast, conducted by Matthias Kuntzsch.

References

Further reading
 "Die Komödie einer Tragödie", Hamburger Abendblatt, 3 November 1965, retrieved 20 May 2009 
 "Er pfeift auf Mode, Schule und Doktrin", Die Zeit, 5 November 1965, retrieved 20 May 2009 
 Michael Herbert Rentzsch and Erik Levi: "Klebe, Giselher", Grove Music Online 
 Alan Blyth: "Czerwenka, Oskar", Grove Music Online 
 Harold Rosenthal and Alan Blyth: "Stolze, Gerhard", Grove Music Online 
 Elizabeth Forbes: "Saunders, Arlene" Grove Music Online

External links
Details, including a plot synopsis at Boosey & Hawkes

German-language operas
Operas by Giselher Klebe
Operas
1965 operas
Operas based on plays
Operas set in France
Opera world premieres at the Hamburg State Opera